Rose Sidgwick (Rugby, 1877 – New York, 1918), was a British university teacher and one of the founders of the International Federation of University Women.

Life and career 
Rose was born on 9 January 1877, the second daughter of Charlotte Sophia Wilson (1853–1924) and Arthur Sidgwick (1840–1920). After the Oxford Girls High School, she received an honours degree in modern history at Oxford. In 1902, she enrolled in the Diploma of Education and passed the examination – with Distinction – one year later. At Somerville College she worked as temporary tutor in history and after a few years, as librarian.

Sidgwick continued her career at the University of Birmingham, where she was appointed as assistant lecturer in History. In addition she was involved in training programs for social workers and supporting the Workers Educational Association.

During a trip to the USA in 1918, Rose, as a member of a British delegation,  met several representatives of American universities and discussed the opportunities for closer cooperation between universities from the UK and the US. During the same visit, she also discussed the founding of a world organisation for higher educated women, with among others Virginia Gildersleeve, Dean of Barnard College, resulting in the launch of  International Federation of University Women.

She died from the effects of flu on December 28, 1918 in New York.

References

External links 
 
 Graduate Women International

British feminists
Fellows of Somerville College, Oxford
1877 births
1918 deaths
Deaths from the Spanish flu pandemic in New York (state)